Philip of Ibelin (born c. 1255; died 25 November 1318, Nicosia) was Seneschal of the Kingdom of Cyprus. As one of the sons of Philippa Barlais and her husband Guy of Ibelin, he was a member of the house of Ibelin.

He married to: 1. c. 1280 Maria, daughter of Vahran of Hamousse by Mary of Ibelin, without issue; 2. c. 1295 Maria (d. 1331), daughter of Guy II of Gibelet, with whom he had:

 Isabella of Ibelin († c.1342), 1. ⚭ 1315 Ferdinand of Majorca († 1316); 2. ⚭ 1320 Hugo of Ibelin, Titular count of Jaffa;
 John of Ibelin (* 1301/02, † 22 October 1317)
 Balian of Ibelin († c.1349)
 Helvis of Ibelin († 1347), ⚭ 1330 Henry II, Duke of Brunswick-Grubenhagen († 1351).
 Guy of Ibelin, seneschal of Cyprus. He married Margaret of Ibelin. Issue:
 John of Ibelin (d. after 1367), seneschal of Cyprus after his father's death.
 Alice of Ibelin (d. after 1374), who married John of Lusignan (1329/30–1375), titular Prince of Antioch and Regent of Cyprus.
 Margaret of Ibelin.

Bibliography 

 Templar of Tyre, Gestes des Chiprois III, edited in: Recueil des historiens des croisades, Documents arméniens. Bd. 2 (1906), S. 737–872.
 René de Mas Latrie (ed.), Chroniques d’Amadi et de Strambaldi, Bd. 1. Paris 1891.

House of Ibelin
13th-century births
1318 deaths